The Mudiraju Koli or Mudiraj Koli and Mutrasi Koli, earlier recorded as Mutracha Koli, is a cultivating subcaste of the Koli caste found in Andhra Pradesh and Telangana.

Titles 
 Mannewad, The Mudiraju Kolis were engaged as village guard under the title of Mannewad.
 Bantu, The Mudiraju Kolis of South India were served as soldiers under several Princely States and Rajas and received the title of Bantu by rulers.
 Cherish, The Mudiraju Kolis who served in ancient kindoms and Empires in India were honoured with the title of Cherish.

Classification 
It is categorised among the Other Backward Classes by the Government of India.

See also
 Muthuraja

References

Indian castes